Carlos Rafael may refer to:

 Carlos Rafael do Amaral (born 1983), Brazilian football midfielder
 Carlos Rafael Fernández (born 1954), Argentine economist and former Minister of the Economy of Argentina
 Carlos Jorge (athlete) (Carlos Rafael Jorge; born 1986), long jumper from the Dominican Republic
 Carlos Rafael Rodríguez (1913-1997), Cuban politician
The University of Cienfuegos "Carlos Rafael Rodríguez" (Spanish: Universidad de Cienfuegos "Carlos Rafael Rodríguez", UCF), a university located in Cienfuegos, Cuba
 Carlos Rafael Uribazo Garrido (born 1951), Cuban artist

See also